Terrie Norlene Miller (born 10 March 1978) is an American-born Norwegian swimmer.

She competed at the European Short Course Swimming Championships 1996, where she won a gold medal in 100 m breaststroke, and a silver medal in 50 m breaststroke. She also won a bronze medal in 50 m breaststroke at the 1994 European Sprint Swimming Championships in Stavanger. She was coached by Sondre Solberg since 1992.

She participated at the 1996 Summer Olympics, where she finished 20th in 100 m breaststroke.

In 1997 she accepted an athletic scholarship to attend the University of Nebraska in Lincoln, Nebraska, where she competed for the Nebraska Cornhuskers swimming and diving team under head coach Cal Bentz, and coaches Jan Bidrman and Paul Nelsen. There she lived and trained with other renowned swimmers: Penny Heyns, Therese Alshammar, Helene Muller, Destiny Laurén, Emma Johnson, Anna Windsor, Lenka Manhalova, Melanie Dodd, Valērijs Kalmikovs and Adam Pine. While swimming for the Cornhuskers, Miller received three All-American honors (1997, 1998 and 1999), and captured two Big 12 Conference titles (1997 and 1998).

Also in 1997, Miller participated in the Norwegian gameshow Mestermøtet broadcast on TV2 presented by Hallvard Flatland.

Miller has 54 senior National Championship medals: 52 in swimming (26 gold, 22 silver and 4 bronze) 1993–2002 and two in ice hockey (gold in 1990 for Vålerenga Hockey and bronze in 2008 for Jordal Ishockeyklubb).

Personal life
Miller was born in Green Bay, Wisconsin, United States on 10 March 1978.

Clubs

Swimming
 Karasjok Svømmeklubb (1985–1987, 1998–2000)
 Alta Svømmeklubb (1988)
 Idrettslaget Varg (1989)
 Oslo Idrettslag (1989–1991)
 Lambertseter Svømmeklubb (1992–1995)
 Tromsø Svømmeklubb (2000–2001)
 Bærumsvømmerne (2001–2003, 2008–2009)

Ice Hockey
 De Pere Hotspurs (1983–1984)
 Vålerenga Hockey (1989–1991)
 Forward SPK Hockey (2006–2008)
 Jordal Ishockeyklubb (2008–2010)
 Ski IL Ishockey (1992–1993, 2017–)

References

External links

Norwegian people of American descent
Norwegian female breaststroke swimmers
Olympic swimmers of Norway
Swimmers at the 1996 Summer Olympics
1978 births
Living people
Nebraska Cornhuskers women's swimmers
University of Nebraska alumni
Norwegian swimmers
Norwegian female freestyle swimmers
Norwegian female medley swimmers
20th-century Norwegian women